The 1983 Oklahoma State Cowboys football team represented Oklahoma State University in the 1983 NCAA Division I-A football season. This was the 83rd year of football at OSU and the fifth under Jimmy Johnson. The Cowboys played their home games at Lewis Field in Stillwater, Oklahoma. They finished the season 8–4, and 3–4 in the Big Eight Conference. The Cowboys were invited to the Astro-Bluebonnet Bowl, where they defeated Baylor, 24–14.

Schedule

Personnel

Season summary

Oklahoma

After the season

The 1984 NFL Draft took place on May 1–2, 1984 at the Omni Park Central Hotel in New York City. The following Oklahoma State players were selected during the draft.

References

Oklahoma State
Oklahoma State Cowboys football seasons
Bluebonnet Bowl champion seasons
Oklahoma State Cowboys football